Aspidoceras is an extinct ammonoid cephalopod genus belonging to the family Aspidoceratidae.

Taxonomy
Aspidoceras, named by Zittel, 1868, is the type genus for the persphictacian family Aspidoceratidae and subfamily Aspidoceratinae in which it is included. It is considered related to genera like Chinamecaceras, Cubaspidoceras, Euaspidoceras, Extranodites, Intranodites, Neaspidoceras, Oligopsychopsis, Orthaspidoceras, Schaireria and Simaspidoceras.

Selected species
† Aspidoceras argobbae Dacque 1905
† Aspidoceras catalaunicum Loriol 1872
† Aspidoceras somalicum Dacque 1905
† Aspidoceras supraspinosum Dacque 1905

Fossil record
Aspidoceras mainly lived during the Late Jurassic (Oxfordian) until Cretaceous (Berriasian), with a fairly broad distribution. Fossils have been found in Italy, Chile, Spain, Algeria, Antarctica, Argentina, Ethiopia, France, Germany, Hungary, India, Iran, Madagascar, Portugal, Romania, Russia, Somalia, Switzerland, the United Kingdom, United States and Canada.

Description
Aspidoceras has an evolute shell with quadrate-rounded or depressed whorls that have two rows of tubercles, the outer near the middle of the whorl sides. The outer row soon fades in many species. Some species are also ribbed. The venter, or outer rim, is generally wide and broadly arched. Aspidoceras was predated by Euaspidoceras, possibly its ancestor.

See also
 List of ammonite genera

References

Further reading
 Arkell, et al.,1957. Mesozoic Ammonoidea; Treatise on Invertebrate Paleontology, Part L (Ammonoidea). Geol Soc of America and Univ Kansas Press. p. L338-339.

Ammonitida genera
Aspidoceratidae
Jurassic ammonites
Cretaceous ammonites
Ammonites of South America
Oxfordian first appearances
Early Cretaceous genus extinctions
Jurassic Argentina
Jurassic Chile
Cretaceous Chile
Cretaceous Spain
Paleozoic life of Quebec